The Lal Bahadur Shastri National Award is an annual prestigious award instituted from Lal Bahadur Shastri Institute of Management, Delhi. This consists of a cash award of 5,00,000 rupees plus a citation and a plaque.

Background
The award was started in 1999 and is provided to a business leader, management practitioner, public administrator, educator or institution builder for his/her sustained individual contributions for achievements of high professional order and excellence. This award is given by the President of India.

Awardees

Award gallery

See also
  Lal Bahadur Shastri Institute of Management

References

External links
  LBS National Award: Excellence in Public Administration, Academics, and Management

Civil awards and decorations of India
Memorials to Lal Bahadur Shastri